¡Pulpo! is a collection of singles and B-sides by Glaswegian lo-fi rock indie band Urusei Yatsura, released in 1997.

Track listing
"Strategic Hamlets" - 2:37
"Down Home Kitty" - 3:39
"Pampered Adolescent" - 5:54
"Kozee Heart" - 3:12
"Miramar" - 3:03
"Saki & Cremola" - 5:17
"Fake Fur" - 3:05
"Silver Krest" - 3:17
"Got the Sun" - 4:00
"Nova Static" - 3:06
"Revir" - 4:05
"The Power of Negative Thinking/The Love That Brings You Down" - 10:45

original release dates:
1995 3, 8, 9
1996 12
1997 1, 2, 4, 5, 6, 7, 10, 11

References

1997 compilation albums
Urusei Yatsura (band) compilation albums